Gebstedt is a village and a former municipality in the Weimarer Land district of Thuringia, Germany. Since 31 December 2012, it is part of the town Bad Sulza.

References

Former municipalities in Thuringia